Cultures 2: The Gates of Asgard is a real-time strategy and city-building video game for Microsoft Windows, released on 26 August 2002 by Funatics Software, a video game developer based in Oberhausen, Germany. The game was published in Germany and Poland by JoWooD Productions and in Russia by Russobit-M. It is part of the Cultures series, and is the sequel to Cultures: Discovery of Vinland.

Gameplay 

In Cultures 2 the player builds and develops Vinland settlements by gathering resources and training citizens in various occupations. The game follows Bjarni, the main character of Cultures (based on the historic figure Bjarni Herjólfsson), in his quest to find all the keys to the gates of Valhalla in Asgard and to defeat the Midgard Serpent as part of Ragnarök.

Development
The game was developed by Funatics Software, and was originally released in Europe in 2002. The game has isometric graphics.

References

External links
 
Michel Bohbot Illustration at www.mbohbot.com

2002 video games
City-building games
Real-time strategy video games
Video games developed in Germany
Video game sequels
Windows games
Windows-only games
Video games with isometric graphics
Fictional Vikings
Video games scored by Fabian Del Priore
Video games set in the Viking Age
Russobit-M games
JoWooD Entertainment games